During the 1995–96 Dutch football season, AFC Ajax competed in the Eredivisie.

Players

First-team squad

Reserve squad

Transfers

In
  Arnold Scholten –  Feyenoord

Out
  John van den Brom –  İstanbulspor
  Tarik Oulida –  Sevilla
  Peter van Vossen –  İstanbulspor
  Frank Rijkaard – retired
  Clarence Seedorf –  Sampdoria

Competitions

Eredivisie

League table

KNVB Cup

Dutch Supercup

UEFA Champions League

Group stage

Knockout phase

Quarter-finals

Semi-finals

Final

Intercontinental Cup

UEFA Super Cup

References

Notes

AFC Ajax seasons
AFC Ajax
Dutch football championship-winning seasons